Wittmackia pernambucentris is a species of plant in the family Bromeliaceae. This species is endemic to the State of Pernambuco in eastern Brazil.

References

pernambucentris
Flora of Brazil
Plants described in 2007